Corrosion of Conformity (COC) is an American heavy metal band from Raleigh, North Carolina. Formed in June 1982, the group originally consisted of guitarist Woody Weatherman, bassist Mike Dean, drummer Reed Mullin and lead vocalist Benji Shelton. The band's current lineup features Weatherman (the only constant member), Dean (who rejoined in 1993 after leaving in 1987), rhythm guitarist and lead vocalist Pepper Keenan (from 1989 to 2006, and since 2014), and drummer John Green (since 2020, who first joined as a touring substitute for Mullin in 2018 until his death).

History

1982–1988
COC was formed in June 1982 by Woody Weatherman, Mike Dean and Reed Mullin. Prior to taking on its final name, the group was known as Barney Fife's Army, the Accused and the Seven Ups. The band's original lead vocalist was Benji Shelton, although he had left within a year of its formation. He was replaced for "about a month and a half" by Robert Stewart, followed on a permanent basis by Eric Eycke. Shortly after the release of the group's debut album Eye for an Eye in 1984, Eycke was fired and the group continued as a trio, with Dean and Mullin handling most vocals.

In early 1986, Simon Bob Sinister (who had performed some backing vocals on Animosity the previous year) took over as COC's lead vocalist, with the EP Technocracy recorded "about six months after" his arrival. Shortly after the EP's 1987 release, Dean left and was replaced by Phil Swisher; speaking about his departure later, Dean has explained that "there was a lot to stress about, and it was kind of a relief to step away", while Sinister has claimed that the bassist "was unhappy with the direction [the band] was going". By 1988, Weatherman and Mullin had also asked Sinister to leave.

1989–2006
After a brief hiatus, COC returned in May 1989 with new frontman Karl Agell. At the same time, the group also added second guitarist Pepper Keenan, who had originally auditioned for the role of lead vocalist but "wasn't really hitting the bill of what we were looking for singing-wise" according to Mullin. The new five-piece lineup released Blind in 1991 and toured extensively; however, during the early stages of production for a follow-up album in summer 1993, Agell was fired and Swisher chose to leave alongside him. Dean subsequently returned and Keenan took over on vocals.

COC's lineup remained constant throughout the rest of the decade, before it was announced at the end of 2000 that Mullin was to be replaced by Jimmy Bower due to a back injury. The new drummer contributed to Live Volume, before he left in mid-2002 to focus on other projects and was replaced by Merritt Partridge. By summer 2004, the group was recording a new album with Galactic drummer Stanton Moore, which was released as In the Arms of God the following year. Due to scheduling conflicts, Moore was replaced by Jason Patterson on tour in 2006.

2006 onwards
Despite reportedly working on material for a new album in November 2006, the group was placed on hiatus for several years as members focused on other projects. In May 2010, the band returned with Mike Dean on lead vocals, alongside Woody Weatherman and Reed Mullin. The group remained a trio for Corrosion of Conformity and IX, before Keenan returned to the lineup in January 2015. During the touring cycle for 2018's No Cross No Crown, Mullin was often replaced by his drum technician John Green due to various health issues. Mullin died on January 27, 2020, and Jon Green became an official member.

Members

Current

Former

Timeline

Lineups

References

External links
Corrosion of Conformity official website

Corrosion of Conformity